Rhonda Milstead is an American politician and businesswoman serving as a member of the South Dakota House of Representatives from the 9th district. Milstead was appointed to the House by Governor Kristi Noem in December 2018 and assumed office on January 7, 2019.

Milstead lives in Hartford, South Dakota.

References 

Living people
Republican Party members of the South Dakota House of Representatives
People from Hartford, South Dakota
Year of birth missing (living people)
21st-century American politicians
21st-century American women politicians
Women state legislators in South Dakota